Acharya Institute of Graduate Studies, or AIGS, is a private co-educational engineering and management college in Bengaluru, India, affiliated with the Bangalore University (BU) and accredited by the National Assessment and Accreditation Council (NAAC). Established in 2005, it offers seven undergraduate courses and nine postgraduate courses.

Acharya organises the Acharya Habba, an annual two-day intercollegiate cultural festival that is one of the largest in Bengaluru and Karnataka.

The Deccan Herald lists AIGS as one of the "notable" colleges to apply the Karnataka Management Aptitude Test (KMAT) for admission to postgraduate management courses.

History

The Acharya Institute of Graduate Studies (AIGS) was established in 2005 by Premnath Reddy, Chairman of the Acharya Group of Institutions. The college is managed by the JMJ Education Society, Headquartered in Bengaluru. AIGS offers seven Under Graduate (UG) courses, eight Post Graduate (PG) courses. All courses are affiliated to the Bangalore University (VTU).

The road was inaugurated by Shivakumara Swamiji of Siddaganga Math in September 2010. It is named Acharya Dr. Sarvepalli Radhakrishnan Road after former Indian President Sarvepalli Radhakrishnan.

In 2012, the institute was granted "Technical Campus" status by the All India Council for Technical Education (AICTE).

On 16 June 2012, the college hosted India's first Heavy metal music festival as a part of Bengaluru Open Air 2012 backed by Germany's Wacken Open Air at the college stadium. German Heavy metal bands and Teutonic thrash metal bands like the Kreator and the Suidakra along with an American Power metal band and Indian metal bands namely Kryptos, Eccentric Pendulum, Dying Embrace, 1833 AD, Bevar Sea and Albatross performed in the fest. Although Iced Earth were scheduled to perform at the fest, but backed out due to the denial of Visa by the Indian embassy.

Course Available in AIGS 
Undergraduate courses

Animation and Design

Arts, Humanities, and Social Sciences

Commerce

Computer Applications and IT

Engineering and Architecture

Management and Business Administration

Media, Mass Communication, and Journalism

Sciences

Departments 

 BACHELOR OF BUSINESS ADMINISTRATION
 BACHELOR OF BUSINESS ADMINISTRATION IN AVIATION
 BACHELOR OF COMPUTER APPLICATION
 BACHELOR OF COMMERCE
 BSC IN FASHION AND APPAREL DESIGN
 BACHELOR OF SOCIAL WORK
 BACHELOR OF ARTS IN PSYCHOLOGY / JOURNALISM / ENGLISH
 BACHELOR OF ARTS IN CRIMINOLOGY / PSYCHOLOGY / SOCIOLOGY
 BACHELOR OF SCIENCE
 MASTER OF BUSINESS ADMINISTRATION
 MASTER OF COMPUTER APPLICATIONS
 MASTER OF COMMERCE
 MASTER OF SCIENCE IN PHYSICS
 MASTER OF SCIENCE IN CHEMISTRY
 MASTER OF SCIENCE IN PSYCHOLOGY
 MASTER OF ARTS IN ENGLISH
 MASTER OF ARTS IN JOURNALISM AND MASS COMMUNICATION
 MASTER OF SOCIAL WORK
 INTERNAL QUALITY ASSURANCE CELL

Acharya Institute of Graduate Studies

One of the Top Graduate Studies College in Bangalore | One of the Best Graduate Studies College in Bangalore 
The Sanskrit word "Acharya" which means "an influential mentor". Epitomizes the quintessential values of our institution, where traditional respect for teachers is of paramount importance.

Acharya Institute of Graduate Studies (AIGS) was founded in 2005, as is counted among the top graduate colleges in Bangalore. The Institute offers undergraduate and postgraduate courses in a variety of subjects that include Language, Sciences, Technology, Commerce, Management, Commerce, Fashion Design, Marketing, Accounting, E-Commerce, etc.  AIGS is endowed with modern physical, technological and academic infrastructure and provides a world-class learning ambience to its students. As the best graduate college in Bangalore, The Faculty members have vocational experience in various streams imparting practical knowledge to students coupled with hands-on learning exercises that include Project Work, Seminars, Workshops, Industrial Visits, etc.

AIGS is committed to mentoring its students beyond the prescribed curriculum, making us one of the top graduate colleges in Bangalore. Through NSS and various social activities, they are made aware of their social responsibilities. Non-English speaking students can learn language skills through Certificate Courses. Seminars and workshops are held to build current awareness and to enable active interaction with experts. In addition to the campus, periodical, Acharya Samachar, video documentaries are also produced by students of the Communications Department. Why wait? Join the best Graduate studied college in Bangalore and kick start your career wheel.

Intelligent Infrastructure 
Designed to suit the needs of every student, the Acharya Infrastructure is recognised as one of the best in the country. From well planned and strategically placed study spaces to congregational areas for students to gather and discuss Acharya has truly thought through every inch of the campus to add purpose to the Acharyan Experience. Labs , research centres, centres of Excellence all caters to the development of students on subject matters where as auditoriums, amphitheatres, etc. helps in the holistic growth of the students.

Unique Learning

The students immensely gain by the best practices put-forth such as 

 Mid-term appraisal by students for initiating mid-course corrective measures for immediate benefit
 Brainstorming sessions with senior faculty to decide policies and review current practices
 Annual Knowledge Conclaves to expose students to practicing Architects through panel discussions, video conferencing, etc.
 Counseling by professional seniors for preparation for career, choice of industry, preparation for facing interview
 Collaboration with industry for research to initiate students into research culture and thus provide them opportunities for developing problem-solving skills
 An internet based integrated e-campus for anytime anywhere info.

APPLY FOR ADMISSON 
VISIT TO OFFICIAL WEBSITE FOR AIGS

Acharya Institute of Technology

References

Engineering colleges in Bangalore
Colleges affiliated to Bangalore University